Gabriel Pereira Taliari (born 13 April 1997), commonly known as Gabriel Taliari, is a Brazilian professional footballer who plays as an attacking midfielder for Brusque, on loan from Capivariano.

Born in Arceburgo, Minas Gerais, he grew up in nearby Mococa, São Paulo, where he began his career going by the nickname Bill in the youth ranks of Radium, for whom he was the club's top scorer in the 2012 U-15 state league. In 2015, he joined Campeonato Paulista Segunda Divisão side EC São Bernardo. He then transferred to Capivariano where he made his senior debut in 2016. Taliari was the league's top goalscorer in the 2018 Campeonato Paulista Série A3 while playing for Capivariano, which prompted him a move to Athletico Paranaense, where he won the 2019 Campeonato Paranaense.

Club career

EC São Bernardo 
Bill played for EC São Bernardo in the 2015 Campeonato Paulista Segunda Divisão. He made his league debut on 17 April 2015, playing the full 90 minutes and scoring the game-tying goal in a 1–1 home draw against local rivals Mauaense. A week later, he scored the lone goal in a 1–0 away win over Manthiqueira. On 29 May, Bill converted a penalty kick in a victory over Guarulhos, and scored again against the same opponent on 1 August. He netted his fifth goal of the season on 6 September in a 2–1 win over Lemense. He finished the campaign with 25 total appearances and five goals as EC São Bernardo finished in fifth place overall.

Capivariano

2016 
His play in the fourth tier of the São Paulo state league got him a move to Paulista A1 side Capivariano. With his team already relegated, he made his senior debut on 10 April as a substitute for Vicente in a 2–1 defeat to Botafogo de Ribeirão Preto in the last round of the first stage of the Paulistão. After the end of the competition, Bill was sent back to the U-20 squad, He scored four goals during the competition and helped the youth side reach the 2016 U-20 Campeonato Paulista finals, losing to São Paulo.

2017 
For the next season, Bill remained in the youth squad for the Copa São Paulo de Futebol Júnior. As the team was eliminated by Chapecoense in the third stage of the cup, Bill led the team in scoring during the competition. He was responsible for four of the 14 goals scored by the club.

Bill then joined the senior team for the Campeonato Paulista Série A2. On 18 February he made his first appearance in the tournament, coming off the bench in the 57th minute in a 1–2 defeat to Taubaté at Arena Capivari. Under new manager Antonio Picolli, he made his first start for the club the following week in a 1–3 home loss to Rio Claro. On 1 March, he netted his first goal of the season, scoring five minutes into the game as Capivariano won their first game of the season, beating Guarani 2–1 at Brinco de Ouro.  He scored two more goals during that month, opening the scoring against Mogi Mirim and XV de Piracicaba, although both games ended in a 1–1 tie. Following three goalless games, Bill scored the game-winning goal in a 2–1 win over Velo Clube on 12 April. Three days later he scored his fifth goal of the season in a 1–1 away draw against Votuporanguense. The Paulistão A2 campaign ended in bittersweet fashion for Bill, as he was Capivarano's top goal scorer in the league but couldn't help his team escape relegation for the second straight season.

On May, he rejoined Capivariano's U-20 squad to play in the U-20 Campeonato Paulista. He scored four times in six games, including a hat-trick in a 7–0 thrashing of Rio Branco.

Loan to Água Santa 
Since Capivariano's senior squad had no more games for the remainder of the year, Bill was loaned to Água Santa to play in the Copa Paulista. He made his first appearance for the Diadema club on 9 July, starting in a 3–2 draw against Juventus-SP at Rua Javari. On 2 September, Bill scored his first goal for the club, converting a penalty kick to secure his team a 2–1 win against Taubaté. After a seven-game goal drought, Bill scored his team's lone goal in a 1–2 home defeat to Inter de Limeira on 11 October.

2018 
Bill scored Capivariano's first goal of the season, netting from the penalty spot ten minutes into their Campeonato Paulista Série A3 opening game against Grêmio Osasco, on 17 January 2018. On 24 January, he scored a brace in a 2–1 away win against Mogi Mirim. He reached six goals in the season during February, scoring against Monte Azul, Taboão da Serra, Marília and Barretos. His form improved the next month, with seven goals scored in seven matches. On 7 April, he scored the second goal in a 3–1 victory against Velo Clube for the second leg of the Paulistão A3 quarterfinals. On 21 April, he scored in the second leg of the semifinals against Atibaia, a game Capivariano ended up losing 2–3 at Ítalo Mário Limongi and narrowly missing promotion to the state league second division.  Bill scored 16 times in the league and was named the Paulistão A3's top goalscorer.

Atlético Paranaense

2018 
On 30 April 2018, Série A side Atlético Paranaense announced it had signed Bill in a one-year loan deal from Capivariano. He made his debut on 20 May, in a Brasileirão away game against Fluminense, where he came on in the 68th minute replacing Matheus Rossetto.

Following sporadic appearances coming off the bench, he was assigned to Atlético's reserve team, for whom he scored once in 12 games.

2019 
Since Athletico chose to play their reserve squad in the 2019 Campeonato Paranaense, Bill got more playing time for Furacão in a senior league. He played his first game of the season on 30 January 2019, coming on as a substitute during a 1–2 Atletiba loss at Arena da Baixada. He made his first start of the season on 10 February in a 1–0 win against Cianorte at home. Bill scored his lone but remarkable goal for Athletico on April 6. He netted an injury time bicycle kick to cap a 3–0 win over Rio Branco for the Taça Dirceu Krüger semifinals. He was an unused substitute in both games of the Campeonato Paranaense finals, as Athletico were crowned champions after defeating Toledo in a penalty shoot-out.

Mirassol 
Following the end of his loan spell at Athletico, he joined Mirassol on loan from Capivariano at the request of head coach Ricardo Catalá. Following advice from his agent, he ditched the nickname Bill and began to be known as Gabriel Taliari in an attempt to get Italian citizenship. He made his Copa Paulista debut on 26 June in a 1–2 home loss to Ferroviária. In the match, Taliari scored his first goal for the club in the first half. In the next match, Taliari scored four goals in a 5–0 win over Batatais. He scored against the same opponent once more on 4 August, a match Mirassol won 6–0. After a month without scoring, Taliari scored the first goal on 4 September, netting a header in a 2–1 away win against his former club Água Santa. Following four more goals against Água Santa, Ferroviária and XV de Piracicaba, Taliari finished the season as Mirassol's top scorer with 10 goals in 23 games.

Ituano 
With two years remaining in his deal with Capivariano, on 19 December 2019, Taliari was loaned for six months to Ituano. He made his first appearance for the new club on 22 January 2020, coming off the bench in the 62nd minute during a 0–4 home loss to Palmeiras in the opening match of the 2020 Campeonato Paulista. On 29 January, Taliari made his first start of the season against Botafogo-SP at Novelli Júnior. On 2 February, he scored his first Ituano goal in a 1–1 away draw against Água Santa. On 17 February, Taliari scored to give Ituano their first win of the season, as they narrowly beat Ponte Preta 1–0. It was reported on 11 June that his loan deal with the Itu club was extended to until the end of the year because of the stoppage of the Paulistão due to the COVID-19 pandemic.

Brusque 
On 4 June 2021, Taliari was signed on loan by Brasileirão Série B side Brusque until the end of the 2021 season. He made his debut nine days later against Avaí, coming off the bench to score a penalty kick in a 2–1 away win. His season came to an end on 17 July, when during a match against Botafogo, he was injured with a torn ACL and a torn meniscus.  Nevertheless, the club extended his contract for another year. He returned to action more than a year later, on 16 July 2022, playing for Brusque in a Série B fixture against CRB.

Career statistics

Honours 
Athletico Paranaense
 Campeonato Paranaense: 2019

Individual
 Campeonato Paulista Série A3 top scorer: 2018

References

External links 
 
 

1997 births
Living people
Brazilian footballers
Association football midfielders
Campeonato Brasileiro Série A players
Campeonato Brasileiro Série C players
Esporte Clube São Bernardo players
Mirassol Futebol Clube players
Capivariano Futebol Clube players
Ituano FC players
Club Athletico Paranaense players
Esporte Clube Água Santa players
Sportspeople from Minas Gerais
People from Mococa